Partido Comunista Revolucionario may refer to:

 Revolutionary Communist Party of Argentina
 Revolutionary Communist Party (Brazil) (Partido Comunista Revolucionário)
 Revolutionary Communist Party (Chile)
 Revolutionary Communist Party (Peru)
 Revolutionary Communist Party (Working Class) (Peru)
 Revolutionary Communist Party (Spain)
 Revolutionary Communist Party – Red Trench (Peru)